Yelena Gennadyevna Matiyevskaya (born 8 March 1961) is a Russian former rower who competed in the 1980 Summer Olympics.

References

External links
 
 Elena BRATISHKO at World Rowing

1961 births
Living people
Russian female rowers
Soviet female rowers
Olympic rowers of the Soviet Union
Rowers at the 1980 Summer Olympics
Olympic silver medalists for the Soviet Union
Olympic medalists in rowing
Medalists at the 1980 Summer Olympics
World Rowing Championships medalists for the Soviet Union